James McNeil (born July 24, 1958) is an American businessman and politician who served as a member of the Vermont House of Representatives from 2008 to 2013 and the Vermont Senate from 2019 to 2021.

Early life and education
James L. McNeil was born in Rutland City, Vermont on July 24, 1958, a son of James F. McNeil and Jane (Masan) McNeil. He attended St. Peter's Elementary School and graduated from Mount Saint Joseph Academy. McNeil went on to complete an associate of science degree in general business at Champlain College in 1978.

Career 
McNeil went into the men's clothing business, and for more than 40 years has been co-owner with his twin brother John of McNeil & Reedy, a Rutland City store that sells men's suits, shoes, and other apparel, and rents tuxedos and other formal wear. A Republican, Reedy served on the Rutland Town Selectboard for four years, in addition to serving as a justice of the peace and a notary public.

A civic activist, McNeil served on the board of the Rutland City Downtown Partnership for four years, and also served on the board of directors of the Rutland Area Visiting Nurse Association. In addition, he served on the Business Advisory Board for the Rutland High School's Stafford Technical Center and Rutland's Christ the King School Board. McNeil is also a former Boy Scouts of America troop leader.

In 2008, McNeil was appointed to the Vermont House of Representatives, filling the seat left vacant by the resignation of David Sunderland. He was elected to a full term in 2008, and reelected in 2010. McNeil served from January 1989 to January 2013, and was a member of the House Agriculture Committee.

In 2018, incumbent Republican Margaret Flory was not a candidate for reelection to the Vermont Senate from the three-member at-large Rutland County District. Incumbent Republicans Brian Collamore and David Soucy ran for reelection, and the other Republican candidates included McNeil, Ed Larson, and Terry Williams. In the August primary, the three Republican nominations were won by Collamore, McNeil, and Larson.

In the November general election, the three top finishers were Collamore, McNeil, and Democrat Cheryl Hooker. McNeil started his Senate term in January 2019, and was appointed to the Education and Transportation Committees. In addition, he was named to the Joint Legislative Justice Oversight Committee, Legislative Council Committee, and Advisory Council on Child Poverty and Strengthening Families.

Personal life
In 1979, McNeil married Lori Ann Creaser of Ludlow. They have two children.

References

External links

Newspapers

1958 births
Living people
21st-century American politicians
Champlain College alumni
People from Rutland (town), Vermont
Republican Party members of the Vermont House of Representatives
Republican Party Vermont state senators